1973 was a year in the 20th century.

1973 may also refer to:

 1973 (number)
 "1973" (song), a 2007 song by James Blunt
 United Nations Security Council Resolution 1973
 1973 (album), a 2012 album by Seirom